Sandy Springs is an underground metro station in Sandy Springs, Georgia, on the Red Line of the Metropolitan Atlanta Rapid Transit Authority (MARTA) rail system. It serves the Perimeter Center area, including high-rise office parks near GA-400 and Abernathy Road, north of Perimeter Mall and within the recently incorporated city of Sandy Springs, the Art Institute of Atlanta, American Intercontinental University, United Parcel Service (UPS World Headquarters), North Park business park, Embassy Row and Cox Communications.

It is adjacent to a large shopping complex that includes a multiplex movie theater, the only MARTA station to have one so close. It is also close to the Atlanta Georgia Temple of the Church of Jesus Christ of Latter-day Saints.

Station layout

Parking
Sandy Springs has 1,170 daily and long-term parking spaces available for MARTA users which are located in one parking deck. Parking entrances are located at Perimeter Center West, and one from the Perimeter Shopping Center parking lot.

Bus routes
The station is served by the following MARTA bus routes:
 Route 148 - Mount Vernon Highway

References

External links

MARTA Station Page
nycsubway.org Atlanta page
 Mount Vernon Highway entrance from Google Maps Street View

Red Line (MARTA)
Railway stations in the United States opened in 2000
Metropolitan Atlanta Rapid Transit Authority stations
Sandy Springs, Georgia
Railway stations in Fulton County, Georgia
2000 establishments in Georgia (U.S. state)